Remerton is a city in Lowndes County, Georgia, United States. The population was 1,123 at the 2010 census. It was incorporated as a town in 1951, and chartered as a city under Georgia law in 2000.
 
Remerton is an enclave of Valdosta and is a popular place for Valdosta State University students to live.

History
Remerton was founded in 1899 as a company town for workers at the Strickland Cotton Mill. It was named for banker Remer Y. Lane. In 1951 Remerton was incorporated as municipality. In January 1979, Strickland Cotton Mills closed. Two months later the mill was purchased by Wipo Inc. and the mill began to operate as Sugar Creek Textiles.

During the 1980s Remerton underwent many changes. Apartments began being built to attract students from what was then known as Valdosta State College. Also, businesses including a Piggly Wiggly were built. In 1985 the L.E. Davis family purchased the Strickland Cotton Mill building from Sugar Creek Textiles. The next year Fred Wilkinson purchased the building and used the building for his Wilkinson Textile Company.

On 1 November 2005, the Strickland Cotton Mill building was purchased by Remerton Mills, LLC. Remerton Mills, LLC is a corporation with local businessman Joseph H. Tillman, Sr. as the registered agent. In 2006 Remerton Mills, LLC announced plans for renovating the Strickland Cotton Mill building into residential and commercial spaces.

In 2012 plans for the demolition of the historic Strickland Cotton Mill were put in motion by Remerton Mills, LLC despite calls from preservationists and locals to save it. Plans were announced to build a park at the site. The demolition of the mill building began in June 2013.

Geography
Remerton is located at  (30.843572, -83.308492).

Demographics

As of the census of 2000, there were 847 people, 440 households, and 124 families residing in the city. The racial makeup of the city was 75.68% White, 19.48% African American, 0.24% Native American, 0.94% Asian, 0.12% Pacific Islander, 1.89% from other races, and 1.65% from two or more races. Hispanic or Latino of any race were 4.13% of the population.

There were 440 households, out of which 12.0% had children under the age of 18 living with them, 15.9% were married couples living together, 8.9% had a female householder with no husband present, and 71.8% were non-families. 33.9% of all households were made up of individuals, and 1.6% had someone living alone who was 65 years of age or older.  The average household size was 1.93 and the average family size was 2.54.

In the city, the population was spread out, with 10.3% under the age of 18, 51.1% from 18 to 24, 29.9% from 25 to 44, 7.1% from 45 to 64, and 1.7% who were 65 years of age or older.  The median age was 23 years. For every 100 females, there were 80.6 males.  For every 100 females age 18 and over, there were 81.8 males.

The median income for a household in the city was $22,411, and the median income for a family was $32,500. Males had a median income of $25,833 versus $21,875 for females. The per capita income for the city was $13,728.  About 18.9% of families and 38.2% of the population were below the poverty line, including 14.7% of those under age 18 and 21.1% of those age 65 or over.

References

External links
City of Remerton Website
City of Remerton WikiMapia View
Information from the State of Georgia Website

Cities in Georgia (U.S. state)
Cities in Lowndes County, Georgia
Cities in the Valdosta metropolitan area
Enclaves in the United States